"Ring Ring" is a song by Swedish group ABBA, released as the title track of their 1973 debut album. The single gave the group their big break in several European countries (although the rest of Europe, North America and Australia would be introduced to ABBA the following year). The song was written in Swedish by Benny Andersson and Björn Ulvaeus, along with their manager Stig Anderson, with an original title of "Ring Ring (Bara du slog en signal)" ("Ring Ring (If Only You Called)"). Translation into English lyrics was helped by Neil Sedaka and his collaborator Phil Cody. The Swedish version reached No. 1 in the Swedish charts.

"Ring Ring" tells of a lover waiting alone by the telephone for the object of her desire to call.

History
After the success of "People Need Love" in 1972 by Björn & Benny, Agnetha & Anni-Frid (as the group was then known), the group's manager, Stig Anderson, realised the potential of coupling the vocal talents of the women with the writing talents of the men. It was then decided that the quartet would record an LP. This eventually turned out to be the album Ring Ring.

Andersson, Ulvaeus and Anderson were invited to enter a song into Melodifestivalen 1973, whose winner would represent Sweden in the 1973 Eurovision Song Contest. After several days, Andersson and Ulvaeus came up with the music for the Swedish version of "Ring Ring", with the working title "Klocklåt" (Clock Tune). Anderson wrote the lyrics with the intention of making a pop-oriented song, trying to remove the pomp and circumstance surrounding the Eurovision Song Contest at the time.

After this, the song was retitled "Ring Ring". To make it more accessible to a universal audience, Anderson asked American songwriter Neil Sedaka to pen the lyrics for an English version. Sedaka was estranged from his lyricist Howard Greenfield at the time but, with the help of his then-current lyricist Phil Cody (who did not usually write in that style), wrote a set of English lyrics.  Record World said that the lyrics co-penned by Sedaka "[deal] with a cold relationship and a silent telephone."

On 10 January 1973, the song was recorded at the Metronome Studio in Stockholm. Studio engineer Michael B. Tretow, who later collaborated with Andersson and Ulvaeus on many singles and albums, had read a book about record producer Phil Spector (Richard Williams' book Out of His Head: The Sound of Phil Spector), famed for his "Wall of Sound" treatment to the songs that he produced. While Spector used several musicians playing the same instruments in the same recording studio at the same time, such a technique would be far too expensive for the recording of "Ring Ring". Tretow's solution was to simply record the song's backing track twice in order to achieve an orchestral sound. Changing the speed of the tape between the overdubs, making the instruments marginally out of tune, increased the effect. This was unlike anything that had been done before in Swedish music.

When ABBA performed "Ring Ring" in the Swedish Eurovision selection competition on 10 February 1973, it was a simpler version arranged by Lars Samuelson and backed by his orchestra, losing the "wall of sound" production sound. The song finished third. Nevertheless, when the studio recording of the song was released it fared much better in the Swedish charts, both in its Swedish and English language incarnations, hitting No. 1 and No. 2 respectively.

The quartet then decided that performing as a group was a serious and realistic idea. They toured Sweden, and despite the failure of "Ring Ring" to represent the country at the 1973 Eurovision Song Contest, they began to prepare themselves for Melodifestivalen 1974 with "Waterloo".

Reception and other versions
Though "Ring Ring" did not get the opportunity to represent Sweden in the 1973 Eurovision Song Contest, the subtitled Swedish version ("Bara Du Slog En Signal") performed very well on the Swedish charts, giving ABBA their first No. 1 hit. The English version fared almost as well, peaking at No. 2 in Sweden, Norway and Austria, and reaching the Top 10 in the charts of the Netherlands, South Africa and Rhodesia (now Zimbabwe). On the official South African year-end chart for 1974, "Ring Ring" placed 13th and its successor "Waterloo" finished 14th. It topped the charts in Belgium, becoming the first of 16 No. 1 hits for ABBA there. "Ring Ring" was the group's first release in the UK in October 1973, but failed to chart, selling only 5,000 copies. in 1973 the single won a gold record in Sweden for selling 100,000 copies. In Scandinavia the single has sold 200,000 copies. A remixed version of the song, with saxophone by Ulf Andersson, was later described by Carl Magnus Palm as having a "superfluous saxophone overdub and leaden sound". This version reached No. 32 in the UK in July 1974, with "Rock'n Roll Band" issued on the B-side. The remix later hit No. 7 in Australia. A second remixed version, based upon the one that had been released in the UK, was included as a bonus track on the original North American release of the Waterloo album. A German-language version of the song was also recorded but failed to chart in West Germany. A Spanish version was also recorded (with lyrics by Doris Band), but was not released until the 1993 CD compilation Más ABBA Oro in selected countries, and internationally on the 1999 edition of ABBA Oro: Grandes Éxitos.

The master tapes of the 1974 remix were presumed missing, or at least unobtainable, for some years. For this reason, the remix did not appear on the 1994 four-CD box-set Thank You for the Music. In 1999, a CD box set of singles was released that included the remix, but it had been mastered from a vinyl single rather than the unavailable master tape. In 2001, The Definitive Collection was released, which finally included the 1974 single remix sourced from the master tape. It was later revealed on Carl Magnus Palm's website that Polar Music had acquired the master tapes from Epic Records in the UK. This had presumably occurred between 1999 and 2001.

Track listings
 Sweden
A. "Ring Ring (Bara Du Slog En Signal)"
B. "Åh vilka tider"

 Sweden, Denmark, Columbia
A. "Ring Ring" (English version)
B. "She's My Kind of Girl"

 UK, Spain, Brazil, Italy, France, West Germany, Peru, Austria, Netherlands
A. "Ring Ring" (English version)
B. "Rock'n Roll Band"

 West Germany
A. "Ring Ring" (German version)
B. "Wer Im Wartesaal Der Liebe Steht"

Personnel
ABBA
Agnetha Fältskog – lead and backing vocals
Anni-Frid Lyngstad – lead and backing vocals 
 Björn Ulvaeus – harmony and backing vocals, rhythm guitar
 Benny Andersson – backing vocals, keyboards
Additional personnel and production staff
 Janne Schaffer – lead guitar
 Rutger Gunnarsson – bass
 Ola Brunkert – drums
 Ulf Andersson – saxophone (English remix)

Charts
Swedish version

Original English version

Remixed English version

Year-end charts

Official versions
 "Ring Ring (Bara du slog en signal)" (Swedish Version)
 "Ring Ring" (English Version)
 "Ring Ring" (English Version) – (1974 Remix, UK Single Version)
 "Ring Ring" (English Version) – (U.S. Remix 1974)
 "Ring Ring" (German Version)
 "Ring Ring" (Spanish Version)
 "Ring Ring" (Medley of Swedish, Spanish and German Versions)

References

1973 songs
1973 singles
ABBA songs
Number-one singles in Belgium
Number-one singles in Sweden
Melodifestivalen songs of 1973
Songs written by Neil Sedaka
Atlantic Records singles
Epic Records singles
Polar Music singles
Songs written by Benny Andersson and Björn Ulvaeus
Songs written by Stig Anderson
Songs about telephones
Music videos directed by Lasse Hallström
Song recordings with Wall of Sound arrangements
Glam rock songs
Songs about telephone calls